Michael Joseph Gilvarry (1924 – 18 September 2004) was an Irish Gaelic footballer. He played for club side Killala and also lined out at inter-county level with the Mayo senior football team.

Career

Gilvarry was a student at Blackrock College in Dublin, and captained the school's rugby union team to a Leinster Senior Cup title. Gilvarry subsequently attended University College Dublin and won a Sigerson Cup title in 1946. At club level, he played with the Killala club. 

Gilvarry first appeared for Mayo in 1945. He won the first of four consecutive Connacht SFC titles in 1948, however, Mayo were later beaten by Cavan in the 1948 All-Ireland final. He claimed his first silverware the following year after victory in the National League. Gilvarry was one of the key forwards when Mayo claimed back-to-back All-Ireland SFC titles after defeats of Louth in 1950 and Meath in 1951. His inter-county performances also earned inclusion on the Connacht team, with Gilvarry winning a Railway Cup medal in 1951.

Death

Gilvarry died on 18 September 2004, at the age of 79.

Honours

University College Dublin
Sigerson Cup: 1946

Mayo
All-Ireland Senior Football Championship: 1950, 1951
Connacht Senior Football Championship: 1948, 1949, 1950, 1951
National Football League: 1948–49

Connacht
Railway Cup: 1951

References

1924 births
2004 deaths
UCD Gaelic footballers
Killala Gaelic footballers
Mayo inter-county Gaelic footballers
Connacht inter-provincial Gaelic footballers